Sir Robert Philp,  (28 December 1851 – 17 June 1922) was a Queensland businessman and politician who was Premier of Queensland from December 1899 to September 1903 and again from November 1907 to February 1908.

Early life
Philp was born in Glasgow, Scotland, the second son of John Philp, a lime-kiln operator, and Mary Ann Philp (née Wylie). He emigrated to Brisbane with his parents and siblings in 1862, where his father took a lease on the municipal baths, and later became involved in the cattle and sugar industries. Philp was educated at the National (Normal) School until 1863 when he started work at Bright Bros & Co shipping company, before moving to Townsville in 1874 to take up the position of junior partner in the trading company Burns, Philp and Company.

Burns, Philp & Co acted as agents and provisioners for the sugar cane and pastoral industries that sustained Northern Queensland, and Philp served as manager of the Townsville office. Beginning in 1881, Philp diverted some of the company's vessels to the labour trade, recruiting South Pacific Islanders (known as Kanakas) to work as indentured labourers on the canefields, despite the reservations of his business partner James Burns. A royal commission into recruiting practices in 1885 coincided with a downturn in the sugar industry, and as a result the company's vessels were returned to other commercial operations. While this affair had been profitable for Burns, Philp, it did not contribute significantly to later commercial success, although it would not be Philp's last interest in the South Pacific labour trade.

Despite the success of Burns, Philp & Co, Philp made some poor personal investments, such as his loss of £5000 on the "Comet" mine. Like many others he was affected by the economic depression of the 1890s, borrowing £20,000 to purchase property in Brisbane which three years later was valued at only £16,230. He also owed considerable sums of money to the North Queensland Mortgage & Investment Co., as well as holding a £5000 mortgage with respect to other properties. Although Burns tried to assist him, Philp was forced to sell his shares in Burns, Philp & Co in 1893, and was still in financial difficulty as late as 1898, although by this stage he had restricted his business ventures to more conservative investments.

When the business-friendly McIlwraith government lost office in 1883 it was succeeded by the Liberal government of Samuel Griffith that sought to end the trade in Kanakas. As a prominent businessman who had served several times on the local council Philp was active in bankrolling and supporting candidates in opposition to Griffith. He supported the growing movement for the separation of North Queensland from the rest of the colony.

Early parliamentary career
Philp entered the Legislative Assembly of Queensland in 1886 as Member for Musgrave. He supported the North Queensland separatists in their unsuccessful attempts to gain independence, but spent most of his early parliamentary career preoccupied with his business affairs. His seat of Musgrave was abolished and in 1888 he was successfully returned as one of the two members for the electorate of Townsville. His parliamentary activity was mainly in support of North Queensland and his business interests – extending railway links to North Queensland, and the abolition of import tariffs. When the import of Pacific islanders was temporarily halted in 1892 Philp was instrumental in securing its resumption.

Premier and opposition leader
Philp was a prolific speculator and in 1893 he was forced by debt to resign from the board of directors of Burns, Philp. In May of the same year McIlwraith, now governing in coalition with Griffith in what was known as the "Continuous Ministry", appointed Philp as Minister for Mines. He held several other ministerial posts, such as Public Instruction, Railways, Public Works and Treasurer until 1899. when the Continuous Ministry was briefly unseated by the Labor government of Anderson Dawson. Philp was an able administrator. He codified mining regulations and encouraged the private development of railways throughout the colony. The railway construction process was alleged to be corrupt by the Labor members, and after narrowly winning a vote of confidence in November 1899 James Dickson resigned as Premier. Dawson's government lasted a week before losing Parliamentary support and Philp, despite his protestations in support of Dickson, was chosen as Premier by his colleagues.

The Australian colonies federated in 1901 and the new Prime Minister Edmund Barton immediately ended the trade in Kanakas. By this stage Queensland was severely depleted in revenue, and Federation exacerbated this situation by depriving Queensland of excise and customs funds. Despite a severe drought and the dire state of the state's finances, Philp was re-elected in 1902. Discontent brewed among Ministerialists who were bitter at missing out on Cabinet positions, and in August 1903 Digby Denham crossed the floor with supporters to bring down the government and form a coalition led by Arthur Morgan.

Philp, with his genial nature, was ill-suited to the position of Opposition Leader, and showed little enthusiasm in attacking the new government. Morgan briefly lost control of the Legislative Assembly in 1904 and Philp was called upon by Governor Sir Herbert Chermside to form a ministry, but could not secure sufficient support from among his colleagues. The end result was a dissolution of Parliament and a solid defeat of the Opposition. Philp resumed his position as Leader and his conciliatory treatment of the government continued when fellow Scot William Kidston became Premier. Philp cultivated good relations with Kidston and helped foster the increasing gap between Kidston and the Labor movement.

Philp's party was again unsuccessful in the elections of 1907. Kidston was encountering difficulties in securing the passage of his legislation through the intransigent Legislative Council and after Lord Chelmsford as Governor refused Kidston's request to appoint sufficient new councillors so as to give Kidston a majority, he resigned in November. Lord Chelmsford commissioned Philp as Premier, but, unable to entice any of Kidston's supporters to his cause, he remained without a majority in the Legislative Assembly, which promptly blocked supply. Over Kidston's protests, Lord Chelmsford guaranteed supply through the issuing of writs and then dissolved the Assembly, but Philp failed to win the subsequent election.

In 1908 Kidston, alienated from the Labor party, relied on Philp's support to pass legislation approving construction of private railways. By October the two leaders had sufficient in common that they negotiated a merger of their two parties, ending Philp's career as Opposition Leader.

Later life
Philp remained in parliament, and also returned to tending his business interests. He enjoyed the status that his long parliamentary career gave him and participated in the foundation of the University of Queensland in 1912. He was a member of the University's first Senate, and its representative at a conference of universities in Glasgow in 1912. Philp lost his seat by a small margin in the Labor landslide of 1915 but remained active in politics, campaigning for the conscription referendums of the First World War and leading the resistance to the abolition of the Legislative Council. In 1920 he led a delegation to London which thwarted Premier Ted Theodore's attempts to gain loans from London financiers to fund government expenditure.

On 17 June 1922 he died in Brisbane and was buried at Toowong Cemetery.

Family 
Philp married Jessie Banister Campbell (daughter of prominent Brisbane businessman James Campbell) in 1878; she died in 1890. In 1898 he married Wilhelmina Fraser Munro; she died in 1940

References 
Philp, Robert — Brisbane City Council Grave Location Search

Further reading 

 Bolton, G C. Robert Philp: Capitalist as Politician. In Murphy D, Joyce R, Cribb M, and Wear, R (Ed.), The Premiers of Queensland pp. 1–29. Brisbane: University of Queensland Press. .
 

1851 births
1922 deaths
Premiers of Queensland
Australian federationists
Australian Knights Commander of the Order of St Michael and St George
Australian politicians awarded knighthoods
Australian people of Scottish descent
People from Fife
Members of the Queensland Legislative Assembly
Burials at Toowong Cemetery
Leaders of the Opposition in Queensland
Treasurers of Queensland
Scottish emigrants to colonial Australia